The 1948 New Zealand rugby league tour of Australia was the fourteenth tour by New Zealand's national rugby league team, and the eleventh tour to visit Australia. The eight-match tour included two Test Matches, which were the first played by New Zealand in Australia since 1909. 
Captained by Pat Smith, the Kiwis returned home having won six and lost two of their games. The team won the first test match of the tour but lost the second.

Squad

Ken Mountford, who was initially selected in the touring party, withdrew due to injury and was replaced by Allen Laird.
The touring squad were the first rugby league team to fly to Australia.
The Rugby League News published pen portraits of the tourists: backs, forwards and the co-managers.

Tour

1st Test

2nd Test

Sources

References

New Zealand national rugby league team tours
Rugby league tour
New Zealand rugby league tour
Rugby league tours of Australia